Challenger is an American brand of agricultural tractors. Created by Caterpillar Inc. in 1986, the brand was sold to AGCO in 2002. Since then, Challenger tractors have been manufactured at the company's Jackson, Minnesota facility.

Production models

Origins
The original model was the Challenger 65 featuring the Mobile-Trac System (MTS) consisting of rubber tracks and a suspension system. Although marketed as the world's first rubber-tracked agricultural tractor, a company using surplus equipment inspired by the design of military tanks had produced a considerable number of rubber tracked tank tractors. The MTS combined the flotation and traction of steel tracks with the versatility of rubber tires.  The use of tracks gave the machines increased tractive performance compared to traditional four wheel drive tractors equipped with tires.  The Challenger 65 began as a  machine used primarily for heavy tillage.

Late 20th century
In 1995 Caterpillar introduced the first "row crop" tracked machines with the Challenger 35, 45 and 55.  These machines ranged in power from 130 KW PTO to 168 KW and were designed to be used for a variety of tasks the larger machines could not. The Challenger tracked tractor was produced by Caterpillar at their Dekalb, Illinois location until the Challenger name and all of its associated agricultural assets were sold to AGCO.

Early 21st century
Since 2002, when the brand was purchased by AGCO, Challenger tractors have been manufactured at the company's Jackson, Minnesota facility. At the time AGCO purchased the Challenger brand most Challenger dealers were also Caterpillar construction equipment dealers. Although AGCO has shifted focus of the Challenger tractor to the agricultural market, the construction market is still an important sector for the tractors as AGCO still manufactures specially configured machines for use with pull-type earth moving equipment.

The Caterpillar Challenger MT875B was the most powerful production tractor available during its span with  engine power. In 2007, the MT875B broke the world record for most land tilled in 24 hours with a custom-made,  disc harrow fabricated by Grégoire Besson. It tilled . The tractor consumed  diesel fuel.

Current
The current production of Challenger tractors has expanded to include both tracked and wheeled type tractors.  Both types are available in either row-crop or flotation type configurations depending upon the preference of the customer. Since their purchase in 2002, the Challenger brand has used a Caterpillar diesel engine in the majority of their models.  However, with the introduction of the D series of each tractor model, AGCO began implementing the use of AGCO Power branded engines that are Tier 4i/Stage 3B emission compliant by using e3, a Selective Catalytic Reduction system which injects urea in engine's exhaust gas stream to reduce nitrogen oxides and particulate matter emitted to the atmosphere.

Former Models

Current Models
 MT400B Series (discontinued)
 MT400D Series (discontinued)
 MT400E Series (utility)
 MT500D Series (discontinued)
 MT500E Series
 MT600D Series (discontinued)
 MT600E Series 
 MT700C Series (discontinued)
 MT700D Series (discontinued)
 MT700E Series (discontinued)
 MT700
 MT800C Series (discontinued)
 MT800E Series (2013-present)
 MT900C Series (discontinued)
 MT900E Series (discontinued)
 MT1000 Series (2017-present)

References

External links
 https://www.grainews.ca/machinery-shop/how-engineers-developed-the-rubber-belted-tractor and https://www.grainews.ca/machinery-shop/how-engineers-invented-the-rubber-belted-tractor-for-ag
 Challenger models by year (on Tractordata)
 Challenger AG USA
 AGCO Corporation

AGCO
Agricultural machinery manufacturers of the United States
Tractor manufacturers of the United States